Jayavarman VIII, posthumous name Paramesvarapada, was one of the prominent kings of the Khmer empire. His rule lasted from 1243 until 1295, when he abdicated. One of his wives was Queen Chakravartirajadevi. He reverted to Hinduism from his father's religion of Buddhism and attempted to destroy Buddhism while patronized Hinduism throughout his regime.

It was during the reign of Jayavarman VIII that the Mongol forces under the command of Kublai Khan attacked the Angkor empire in 1283. In 1281, Jayavarman VIII had imprisoned emissaries of the Mongol generalissimo in Champa. In 1283, he decided to pay tribute and buy peace and thus his rule survived. Chinese annals record that in 1291, "the king of Lohu" [Cambodia] sent a mission who presented “the usual tribute of gold, elephant ivory and other things”. In 1290, the Mon people regained their independence.

Jayavarman VIII suffered a devastating war against the Sukhothai Kingdom.

Jayavarman VIII was a Shivaite. Many of the Buddhist images were destroyed by him, who re-established previously Hindu shrines that had been converted to Buddhism by his predecessor. Carvings of the Buddha at temples such as Preah Khan were destroyed, and during this period the Bayon Temple was made into a temple of Shiva, and cast the central 3.6 meter tall statue of the Buddha into the bottom of a nearby well. He also endowed a Hindu shrine Mangalartha in 1295, just before he was overthrown by his son-in-law Indravarman III (Srindravarman), a devout Buddhist and the kingdom reverted to Buddhism.

References

13th-century Cambodian monarchs
Hindu monarchs
Khmer Empire
Cambodian Hindus
Year of birth unknown
Year of death unknown